The pencil cardinalfish (Epigonus denticulatus) is a species of deepwater cardinalfish found around the world at depths of .

The pencil cardinalfish and the bulls-eye are very similar, except the former has seven spines in the first dorsal fin, whereas the latter has eight.

References

External links
 Photograph

Epigonidae
Fish described in 1950